Orontium mackii is an extinct golden club species in the family Araceae described from a series of isolated fossil leaves.  The species is known from Late Cretaceous sediments exposed in the state of New Mexico in the United States of America.  It is one of several extinct species placed in the living golden-club genus Orontium.

History and classification
Orontium mackii has been identified from a series of three exposures in the Jose Creek member of the McRae Formation. The Jose Creek member is dated as probable Maastrichtian, based on the conformable contact between the Jose Creek member and the overlying Hall Creek member. In addition the site hosts a grouping of conifer megafossils which is comparable to that found in other southern and central North American fossil sites of Maastrichtian age. Of the three sites from which O. mackii is known, two preserve a typical wet environment which had standing water and wet soil conditions, as is seen in modern O. aquaticum habitats. The third site for O. mackii differs, being found in a paleo-flood plain, which was made up of well-drained soils and no obligate aquatic plants. If this is a correct interpretation, it has been suggested that, unlike the other two species in the genus, O. mackii was not dependent on wetland or aquatic conditions for survival.  

The species was described from a type specimen, the holotype TXSTATE-1001, and a group of five paratypes, all of which are currently preserved in the paleobotanical collections housed at the Texas State University, in San Marcos, Texas.  The specimens were studied by a group of paleobotanists led by Josef Bogner, with the team publishing their 2007 type description for O. mackii in the Journal Zitteliana.  The etymology of the chosen specific name mackii is in recognition of Gregory H. Mack, in honor of his longtime contributions to New Mexico geology, and for discovering the site which produced O. mackii.

Description
The leaf tips are not known, due to the incomplete nature of the fossils found. As such, it is not certain whether O. mackii had leaf tips which were hooded in shape as are the leaves of both O. wolfei and O. aquaticum. The lateral veins of the leaves are composed of only two orders and are connected by a single order of crossveins while the midrib of the leaves is most distinct towards the leaf base. In the fossils the midrib is noted for a tendency to accumulate iron oxides.

References

Orontioideae
Plants described in 2007
Fossil taxa described in 2007
Late Cretaceous plants
Flora of New Mexico
Extinct flora of North America
Cretaceous angiosperms